Nigel Robert Johnson (born 14 July 1953) is a male British former swimmer. Johnson competed in the men's 200 metre breaststroke at the 1972 Summer Olympics. At the ASA National British Championships he won the 220 yards breaststroke title in 1970.

References

External links
 

1953 births
Living people
British male swimmers
Olympic swimmers of Great Britain
Swimmers at the 1972 Summer Olympics
Place of birth missing (living people)
Commonwealth Games medallists in swimming
Commonwealth Games bronze medallists for Wales
Swimmers at the 1970 British Commonwealth Games
People educated at Millfield
Medallists at the 1970 British Commonwealth Games
Welsh male swimmers